Sworn brothers are males either siblings by birth or who have sworn loyalty to each other.

Sworn brother also refers to:

 Three Knights-Errant and Five Sworn Brothers, also translated as Three Heroes and Five Gallants, a novel based on Shi Yukun's plays about Bao Zheng, his subordinates and his allies.
 Little Five Sworn Brothers, also translated as Five Younger Gallants, a sequel of the novel above.
 Sworn Brothers, 1987 Hong Kong film.
 Rebels, Rogues & Sworn Brothers, a Lucero album.